The Thurgood Marshall College Fund (TMCF) is an American non-profit organization that supports and represents nearly 300,000 students attending its 47 member-schools that include public historically black colleges and universities (HBCUs), medical schools, and law schools. The organization is named after the Supreme Court's first African-American Justice, Thurgood Marshall.

History
The organization was established in 1987, under the leadership of Dr. N. Joyce Payne in cooperation with Miller Brewing Company, Sony Music, the NBA, Reebok and the American Association of State Colleges and Universities to institutionally support public HBCUs. It underwent a name change in 2006 from the Thurgood Marshall Scholarship Fund to the Thurgood Marshall College Fund.

TMCF has championed higher education at public historically black colleges and universities (HBCUs) and has grown from a small organization providing scholarships for public HBCUs, raising over $300 million to date for programmatic support, capacity building support, and scholarships for its member-schools and the students matriculating on the campuses.

Its mission differs from that of the United Negro College Fund, which supported approximately 65,000 students at 900 colleges and universities with approximately $113 million in grants and scholarships in 2015 alone, while the Thurgood Marshall College fund only supports 47 schools; it is a 501(c)(3) tax-exempt, charitable organization, which means it does not pay taxes on its income.

TMCF was granted $50 million in 2015 by Apple, $26.5 million in 2017 by the Charles Koch Foundation and Koch Industries, and $6 million by The Boeing Company in 2018.

Acquisitions
In 2013, TMCF acquired the Opportunity Funding Corporation (OFC), merging the two organizations with TMCF becoming the parent organization. Both organizations share a similar mission of providing service to the HBCU community, particularly in the area of talent identification. While continuing its efforts to enhance the entrepreneurship curriculum within public and private HBCUs, OFC will identify the most promising future entrepreneurs and introduce them to potential investors and very successful entrepreneurs.

Leadership
 Harry L. Williams became president and CEO in 2018.
 Johnny C. Taylor Jr. was president and CEO from 2010 to 2018.
 Johnny Parham became the first executive director in 1994.
 Dwayne Ashley served as president and the chief executive officer from 1999 to 2010 and created the Leadership Institute and Member Schools Conference. 
 John W. Marshall, a son of Thurgood Marshall, served as a consultant and senior advisor to the organization from January 2010 to January 2011.

Member-Schools Listing 
Member-School Breakdown:

 47 Member-School Breakdown
 42 HBCUs: 4-year Historically Black Colleges and Universities
 6 LAW: HBCU Law Schools
 1 MED: HBCU Medical School
 3 PBIs: 4-year Predominantly Black Institutions
 1 JUCO: Community College
 1 HBGI: Private Historically Black Graduate Institute

TMCF Partners

Scholarships 

 Wells Fargo
 Hershey
 Lowe's
 Molson Coors
 Honda
 Charles Koch Foundation
 Coca-Cola
 NHL
 NBA
 Costco Wholesale
 Apple
 Altria
 McDonald's
 Medtronic Foundation
 VISA
 Mondelez International
 Cheniere
 T-Mobile

K-12 Initiatives 

 Wells Fargo
 Molson Coors
 Amgen
 DuPont

Student Leadership and Talent Sourcing 

 Wells Fargo
 Walmart
 Molson Coors
 Hershey
 Koch Industries Inc
 Medtronic
 Apple
 United Airlines
 Microsoft
 Merrill Lynch
 Amazon
 Gallup
 John Deere
 Kellogg's
 Booz Allen Hamilton
 Ally
 Marines

Innovation and Entrepreneurship 

 Ally
 Apple
 John Deere
 Wells Fargo

Higher Education Research 

 Walton Family Foundation
 Koch
 Charles Koch Foundation

Board of Directors 

 Breakthru Beverage Group
 NHL
 Boeing
 Wells Fargo
 Sidley Austin LLP
 Costco Wholesale
 Walmart
 John Deere
 GCM Grosvenor
 Central State University
 United Airlines
 Molson Coors
 JPMorgan Chase
 Altria
 Lincoln University
 NBA
 K&L Gates
 Booz Allen Hamilton
 Hershey
 ManpowerGroup
 Honda

References

External links
Official website

 
Scholarships in the United States
501(c)(3) organizations
1987 establishments in Washington, D.C.
Thurgood Marshall